Arno Paulsen (1900–1969) was a German actor who appeared in around sixty films in the post-Second World War years. He also appeared frequently on stage and was also a voice actor dubbing foreign films for release in Germany. He appeared in a mixture of West German and East German films. He made his film debut in the 1946 rubble film Murderers Among Us.

Selected filmography
 Murderers Among Us (1946)
 Wozzeck (1947)
 Raid (1947)
 Blum Affair (1948)
 Chemistry and Love (1948)
 The Adventures of Fridolin (1948)
 Street Acquaintances (1948)
 Girls Behind Bars (1949)
 Martina (1949)
 The Bridge (1949)
 Hoegler's Mission (1950)
 Third from the Right (1950)
 Bürgermeister Anna (1950)
 Five Suspects (1950)
 The Orplid Mystery (1950)
 Torreani (1951)
 Bluebeard (1951)
 When the Heath Dreams at Night (1952)
 The Uncle from America (1953)
 We'll Talk About Love Later (1953)
 Anna Susanna (1953)
 Red Roses, Red Lips, Red Wine (1953)
 I and You (1953)
 Christina (1953)
 Canaris (1954)
 Alibi (1955)
 Liane, Jungle Goddess (1956)
 My Father, the Actor (1956)
 Der Stern von Afrika (1957)
 Munchhausen in Africa (1958)
 Robert and Bertram (1961)
 Hands Up or I'll Shoot (1965)

References

External links

Bibliography 
 Brockmann, Stephen. A Critical History of German Film. Camden House, 2010.

1900 births
1969 deaths
German male film actors
Actors from Szczecin
People from the Province of Pomerania
German male voice actors
German male stage actors
20th-century German male actors